Bartonia is an unincorporated community in Wayne Township, Randolph County, in the U.S. state of Indiana.

History
Bartonia was platted in 1849 by Edward Barton, and named for him. A post office was established at Bartonia in 1852, and remained in operation until 1903.

Geography

References

Unincorporated communities in Randolph County, Indiana
Unincorporated communities in Indiana